La Palapa is a restaurant in Puerto Vallarta, in the Mexican state of Jalisco.

Description and reception
La Palapa, located along the Malecón at Playa de los Muertos in Zona Romántica, specializes in seafood. According to Los Angeles magazine, the restaurant "has barefoot dining with unobstructed views of the sunset and the beautifully lit" Los Muertos Pier. The menu includes miso Chilean sea bass, pepper-crusted yellowfin tuna, grilled shrimp in coconut and tequila, and pork tenderloin stuffed with chorizo, pecans, and goat cheese. Roasted stuffed chicken breast, pork loin, and seared yellowfin tuna drizzled in cacao sauce are also available. The menu also features oysters, peach-and-pistachio salad, red snapper, and risotto with clams and shrimp.

Fodor's says, "This large, welcoming, thatched-roof eatery is open to the breezes of Playa Los Muertos and filled with wicker-covered chandeliers, art-glass fixtures, and lazily rotating ceiling fans. The menu meanders among international dishes with modern presentation... The seafood enchilada plate is divine. It's pricey, but the beachfront location and, in the evening, the low lights and Latin jazz combo (8 to 11 pm nightly), keep people coming back. Breakfast here (daily after 8 am) is popular with locals as well as visitors. This is the sister property to Vista Grill, which has great views of the bay from the hills above town."

According to Frommer's, which rates the restaurant 2 out of 3 stars, "This beachside palapa restaurant defines enchantment, a decades-old favorite with beautiful amber lamps, candles, and lanterns illuminating the night... The Palapa's location on Los Muertos Beach makes dinner especially enticing for moon watching over the bay. The bar opens to the dining area and features acoustic guitars and vocals nightly from 8 to 11pm. The restaurant doubles as a beach club during the day."

The Daily Telegraph has described La Palapa as a "glam favourite" of Elizabeth Taylor. In 2011, Kris Hudson of The Washington Post recommend La Palapa for "finer" dining.

See also

 List of restaurants in Mexico
 List of seafood restaurants

References

External links

 
 La Palapa at Banderas News

Restaurants in Jalisco
Seafood restaurants in Mexico
Zona Romántica